MS Cruise Smeralda is a RO/PAX ferry operated and owned by Grimaldi Lines. The ship was built in Fosen Mek Verksteder A/S, Norway for Minoan Lines in 1997. It has a sister ship: Jean Nicoli for Corsica Linea. Her first name was Ikarus and then renamed Ikarus Palace.

Minoan Lines Career 

The ship made her career for Minoan Lines in 1997 and worked the Patras-Igoumenitsa-Corfu-Venice route for many years with her sister ship Pasiphae. In 2001 both ships were renamed. The first renamed Ikarus Palace and the second Pasiphae Palace. They worked both of them many years in the same route until Pasiphae Palace was sold to SNCM and renamed Jean Nicoli. Ikarus Palace also made worked the Piraeus-Heraklion route replacing another ship of her company. After the arrivals of the newest ships MS Cruise Europa, MS Cruise Olympia, Ikarus Palace laid-up in Patras and then made Patras-Igoumenitsa-Ancona route and then replace HSF Knossos Palace and HSF Kydon Palace in Piraeus-Heraklion route.

Chartered to Grimaldi Lines 
Ikarus Palace then chartered for Grimaldi Lines. The ship when chartered for Grimaldi Lines began the Livorno-Barcelona-Tangier route. The ship also came many times in Greece to replace other ships of her company. The ship made her last route Patras-Igoumenitsa-Ancona route in 2016 and then sold to Grimaldi Lines and named Cruise Smeralda.

Route 
Cruise Smeralda made every day Barcelona-Tanger-Savona-Barcelona route.

References

Ferries of Italy
1997 ships
Ships built in Norway